Florida breaks, which may also be referred to as The Orlando Sound, Orlando breaks, or The Breaks, is a genre of breakbeat dance music that originated in the central region of the State of Florida, United States.
Florida Breaks originates from a mixture of hip-hop, Miami bass and electro that often includes recognizable sampling of early jazz or funk beats from rare groove or popular film.  Florida's breakbeat style feature vocal elements and retains the hip-hop rhythms on which is based.  
The Florida breakbeat style however is faster, more syncopated, and has a heavier and unrelenting bassline. The beat frequently slows and breaks down complex beat patterns and then rebuilds. The genre has been described as being easy to dance to while creating an uplifting, happy, or positive mood in the listener.

History

Late 1980s – early 1990s

The unique Florida style was first encountered during the late '80s inside the historic Beacham Theatre in Orlando.  The breaks genre started to gain local popularity as a local underground music subculture developed during Orlando's Summer of Love era from roughly 1989 to 1992.  Eddie Pappa, influenced by nights spent at the Beacham, honed his skill at The Edge when it opened in 1992 and is considered a pioneer in the Breaks genre. It gained prominence state-wide in 1993. By mid-1993, Large events at the Edge helped launch the popularity of the Florida breaks elsewhere in the U.S. Europe began to take notice of Orlando's expanding culture.

Mid 1990s popularity

The Breaks strongly influenced other producers who mixed breakbeat with progressive, and trance. This mixture became known as "The Orlando Sound." The sound gained acclaim and became wildly popular among DJs and club goers during the mid 1990s and was marketed internationally as "Orlando friendly."

Nick Newton, an English breaks DJ and producer, called his 1996 record Orlando and the Orlando Sound was also referred to as Florida breaks.

However, there did not seem to universal consensus on the exact elements that constituted the Florida Sound.  The genre's inspirational influences have created regional and preference variations of the Breaks within Florida that have made the genre more difficult to define. For example, the Orlando Sound of Central and Northern Florida were strongly influenced by new beat, trance and progressive house sounds.   Producers in South Florida and Tampa kept with a deep house flavor or retained more of the funk and hip-hop influence of Miami's so-called "ghetto-bass" that evolved and is sometimes called the funky breaks.

The genre received limited local radio play in Central Florida on radio stations WXXL (106.7 FM) and on college radio WPRK (91.5 FM), as well as WUCF (89.9 FM), WFIT (89.5 FM on Space Coast), and WMNF (88.5 FM in Tampa).

2000s
The international and local popularity of Florida breaks peaked and began to wane in 2000.  However, the genre is still quite popular in Central Florida as well as among those who remember the era and the genres unique role in electronic music history.

Early Florida breaks venues 

AAHZ at the Beacham Theatre (Orlando), The Edge (Orlando). The Abyss (Orlando), The Club at Firestone (Orlando), The Beach Club (Orlando), Icon (Orlando), Simon's (Gainesville),  Marz (Cocoa Beach), The Edge (Fort. Lauderdale), and Masquerade (Tampa).

See also 

 Break beat (element of music)
 Breakbeat (genre)
 Breakdown (music)
 Broken beat (genre)

References

External links
 Florida Breaks from Ishkur's Guide to Electronic Music

Breakbeat genres
Music of Florida